Muḥammad ibn Ṭalḥa was the son of the prominent Muslim general Talha ibn Ubayd Allah and Hammanah bint Jahsh.
Muhammad had two sons and a daughter from his marriage with Khawla (daughter of the Fazara chief Manzur b. Zabban). He was killed in the Battle of Camel, after which, his wife, Khawla, married with Hasan ibn Ali.

Hammanah was the sister of Zaynab bint Jahsh, one of Muhammad's wives. He and his father died at the battle of the Camel.

See also
Muhammad (name)
Talha (name)

References

Tabi‘un
7th-century Arabs
656 deaths
Banu Taym